The Dubai International Exhibition and Convention Centre was built in 1979 by Sheikh Mohammed bin Rashid Al Maktoum, Vice President and Prime Minister of the UAE and Ruler of Dubai.

The complex comprises the original 39-story office tower, the World Trade Centre Residence, eight exhibition halls, the Dubai International Convention Centre, which can accommodate more than 4500 delegates in its multi-purpose hall when set in auditorium style, a business club, and residential apartments with a leisure club.

The DICC has 35,000 square metres of adjoining exhibition space.

Building Type - Convention, Exhibition, Financial 
Architect - Tony Kettle
Location - Dubai, UAE

See also
 List of buildings in Dubai

External links
 Official site

Buildings and structures in Dubai
Convention centers in the United Arab Emirates